Catajapyx confusus is a species of forcepstail in the family Japygidae.

Subspecies
These five subspecies belong to the species Catajapyx confusus:
 Catajapyx confusus aegea (Silvestri, 1932)
 Catajapyx confusus aquilonaris (Silvestri, 1931)
 Catajapyx confusus confusus (Silvestri, 1929)
 Catajapyx confusus moravica (Kratochvil, 1946)
 Catajapyx confusus rumena (Silvestri, 1931)

References

Diplura
Articles created by Qbugbot
Animals described in 1929